Cultural Centre (Bosnian: Centar za kulturu) is a city-sponsored  art institution in Mostar, Bosnia and Herzegovina. During the month of July, the Centre organizes the Mostar Summer Festival (Mostarski Ljetni Festival) that has been held annually for over twenty years.  
The festival includes various art events such as concerts, theatre performances, puppet-shows, art exhibitions, poetry readings, and book presentations.

Cultural Centre's address is Rade Bitange 13 and its phone number is  +387 (0)36 580 216.

References

Arts centres in Bosnia and Herzegovina
Theatre in Bosnia and Herzegovina
Buildings and structures in Mostar